United Express Flight 6291 was a regularly scheduled United Express flight from Washington Dulles International Airport near Washington, D.C. to Port Columbus International Airport in Columbus, Ohio. It was a service operated by Atlantic Coast Airlines on behalf of United Express.

Late on the night of January 7, 1994, the British Aerospace Jetstream 41 operating as Flight 6291 stalled and crashed on approach to Port Columbus International Airport. The two pilots, the flight attendant, and two passengers died in the crash. The surviving passengers were a Taiwanese family of three.

Accident 

Flight 6291 left the gate at Dulles at 21:58 (9:58PM) for the 90-minute flight to Columbus. The crew consisted of Captain Derrick White (35), First Officer Anthony Samuels (29), and a 58-year-old flight attendant. There were five passengers on board.

At 23:10 (11:10PM), Columbus Approach Control was contacted. A runway 28L ILS approach clearance was given when the flight passed the SUMIE final approach fix. A clearance to land on runway 28L was given two minutes later.

The aircraft was descending through an altitude of  when the stick shaker activated and sounded for 3 seconds. After 1.5 seconds, the stick shaker sounded again. The aircraft continued to descend below the glide slope until it collided with a stand of trees in a high nose-up attitude. It came to rest upright in a commercial building,  short of the runway. After the impact, a fire started in or near the left engine, which spread to the rest of the aircraft. At least four of the passengers survived the crash; however, only threea family escaped before the aircraft was fully engulfed in flames; though they were slowed by difficulty getting their seatbelts to release.

Investigation 
The National Transportation Safety Board (NTSB) investigated the crash and released its report on October 6, 1994. In the report, the crew and Atlantic Coast Airlines were faulted for the crash. The pilots followed a poorly planned and executed approach, then improperly responded to a stall warning, and lacked experience in aircraft equipped with an electronic flight instrument system. Atlantic Coast failed to provide adequate stabilized approach criteria, suitable training simulators, and crew resource management training.

In addition, the report recommended that the type of seatbelts used on the aircraft be removed from service on all airplanes, and that certification of future seatbelt designs include a test matching the conditions that were experienced during this incident.

In popular culture 
The crash of United Express Flight 6291 was covered in "Slam Dunk", a Season 19 episode of the internationally syndicated Canadian TV documentary series Mayday.

See also  
Colgan Air Flight 3407a similar accident caused by an aerodynamic stall

References

Aviation accidents and incidents in the United States in 1994
Accidents and incidents involving the British Aerospace Jetstream
Airliner accidents and incidents in Ohio
Airliner accidents and incidents caused by pilot error
1994 in Ohio
Gahanna, Ohio
January 1994 events in the United States